Igor Lambulić (Cyrillic: Игop Лaмбулић, born 21 September 1988) is a Montenegrin retired football striker.

Now he is the owner of the football management agency Lamfoot international.

Club career
Born in Titograd (currently known as Podgorica, Montenegro), he played for Montenegrin club FK Zeta, Spanish team Pontevedra CF, Portuguese team C.A. Valdevez, Bulgarian club PFC Beroe Stara Zagora, Hungarian club Kaposvári Rákóczi FC and Serbian SuperLiga side FK BSK Borča.  During the second half of the 2011–12 season and the first half of 2012–13 season he was with FK Čukarički in the Serbian First League.  In the winter break of 2013–14 season he joined FK Slavija.

References

External links
 
 Igor Lambulić Stats at Utakmica.rs

1988 births
Living people
Footballers from Podgorica
Association football forwards
Montenegrin footballers
FK Zeta players
Pontevedra CF footballers
PFC Beroe Stara Zagora players
OFK Grbalj players
FK Rudar Pljevlja players
Kaposvári Rákóczi FC players
FK BSK Borča players
FK Čukarički players
FK Slavija Sarajevo players
FK Dečić players
Montenegrin First League players
Segunda División B players
First Professional Football League (Bulgaria) players
Segunda Divisão players
Nemzeti Bajnokság I players
Serbian First League players
Premier League of Bosnia and Herzegovina players
Montenegrin expatriate footballers
Expatriate footballers in Spain
Montenegrin expatriate sportspeople in Spain
Expatriate footballers in Bulgaria
Montenegrin expatriate sportspeople in Bulgaria
Expatriate footballers in Portugal
Montenegrin expatriate sportspeople in Portugal
Expatriate footballers in Hungary
Montenegrin expatriate sportspeople in Hungary
Expatriate footballers in Serbia
Montenegrin expatriate sportspeople in Serbia
Expatriate footballers in Bosnia and Herzegovina
Montenegrin expatriate sportspeople in Bosnia and Herzegovina
Association football agents